Joint monarchy may refer to:
 Coregency, two monarchs in one state
 Personal union, one monarch in two states
 Condominium (international law), two states sharing sovereignty over one territory